Coniophanes piceivittis, known commonly as   Cope's black-striped snake, is a species of small snake in the subfamily Dipsadinae of the family Colubridae. The species is endemic to Central America and Mexico, and is found in a wide range of habitats.

Geographic range
C. piceivittis is found in Costa Rica, El Salvador, Guatemala, Honduras, southern Mexico, and Nicaragua.

Reproduction
C. piceivittis is oviparous.

Subspecies
Two subspecies are recognized as being valid, including the nominotypical subspecies.
Coniophanes piceivittis frangivirgatus 
Coniophanes piceivittis piceivittis

References

Further reading
Cope ED (1869). "Seventh Contribution to the Herpetology of Tropical America". Proceedings of the American Philosophical Society, Philadelphia 11: 147–169. (Coniophanes piceiviitis, new species, pp. 149–150).
Heimes, Peter (2016). Snakes of Mexico: Herpetofauna Mexicana Vol. I. Frankfurt, Germany: Chimaira. 572 pp. .
Peters JA (1950). "A New Snake of the Genus Coniophanes from Veracruz, Mexico". Copeia 1950 (4): 279–280. (Coniophanes frangivirgatus, new species).

Coniophanes
Reptiles of Costa Rica
Reptiles of El Salvador
Reptiles of Guatemala
Reptiles of Honduras
Reptiles of Mexico
Reptiles of Nicaragua
Reptiles described in 1869
Taxa named by Edward Drinker Cope